Grypopalpia is a genus of moths in the family Sesiidae.

Species
Grypopalpia iridescens  Hampson, 1919
Grypopalpia uranopla (Meyrick, 1934)

References

Sesiidae